The discography of Susan Boyle, a Scottish singer, contains seven studio albums and thirteen singles. Boyle achieved global attention after auditioning for Series 3 of Britain's Got Talent in 2009. After much attention, Boyle signed a record deal with British record producer Simon Cowell, releasing her worldwide multi-platinum selling début album I Dreamed a Dream. The album's first two singles, "Wild Horses" and "I Dreamed a Dream" were successful, both reaching the top forty of the UK Singles Chart.

In the United States, Boyle's album charted at number one on the Billboard 200 album charts. The singles were a success in the United States, with "Wild Horses" making ninety-eight and "I Dreamed a Dream" making sixty-two. In 2010, Boyle was one of few artists who featured on Simon Cowell's 2010 Haiti earthquake appeal single, "Everybody Hurts", a cover of the R.E.M. song.

On 9 July 2010, Boyle announced that her second album would be a Christmas album entitled The Gift. As part of the lead-up to the album, she held a competition called Susan's Search, the winner of which sang a duet with her on her new CD. The album was released on 8 November 2010.

Emeli Sandé was reported to have helped Boyle to write songs for her third studio album, Someone to Watch Over Me, which was released on 31 October 2011. Boyle performed on the second semi-final results show of the sixth season of America's Got Talent, which aired on 31 August 2011. Boyle made her first appearance in Australia, on The X Factor, on 8 November 2011 and sang "Autumn Leaves". In November 2012 she released her fourth studio album, Standing Ovation: The Greatest Songs from the Stage. In two of the songs, she collaborates with Donny Osmond.

As of 2013, Boyle had sold over 25 million records worldwide.

Albums

Studio albums

Compilation albums

Video albums

Singles

As lead artist

As featured artist

Music videos

References

Discographies of British artists
Discography